Central Saint Petersburg is the central and the leading part of Saint Petersburg, Russia. It looks nothing like the downtown district of a typical major city, and has no skyscrapers. The Central Business District's main borders are Neva River to the north and west, and the Fontanka River to the south and east, but the downtown includes areas outside.

History
The Central Saint Petersburg is the oldest part of the city after the Peter and Paul Fortress. When people were starting to populate Saint Petersburg they built their houses around the almost only building outside the fortress; the Admiralty building. The largest industry was ship building. The first residence of Peter the Great was a little hut (the hut hasn't been destroyed and is a museum), but he soon started to build the Summer Palace, which was located just opposite the hut, on the other side of the Neva River, and later he built a Winter Palace for himself. The central part of the city was supposed to be between the Peter and Paul Fortress and his first house.

Overview
The CBS is an area with many old buildings and has beautiful parks like the Summer Garden, Field of Mars and Mikhailovsky Garden. It is also the wealthiest area in Saint Petersburg, home to luxury hotels like Hotel Astoria and Grand Hotel Europe. It has always been a wealthy district since the rich noble Russians built their mansions here.

Administratively, the Saint Petersburg central business district falls under the authority of Tsentralny and the Admiralteysky Districts.

The CBS is also a main traffic hub, with tramways, trolleybuses, buses, marshrutkas, and the Moscow Rail Terminal.

Streets and squares
Significant streets are Nevsky Prospekt, the heart of the city, and is one of the largest shopping streets in Europe, with department stores like Gostiny Dvor and The Passage. It's also home to the Kazan Cathedral and Anichkov Palace.

Sadovaya Street is a main street in downtown with high traffic, home to Yusupov Palace, Apraksin Dvor department store, and crossing the Sennaya Square; a main square, with entertainment, commercial and many shops.

St Isaac's Square is home to the St Isaac's Cathedral and Mariinsky Palace, and has a monument dedicated to tsar Nicholas I of Russia.
On the other side of the cathedral is the Decembrists Square, next to the Admiralty building, and the location of the Bronze Horseman.

Palace Square is home to the Winter Palace and the Hermitage.

Arts Square is home to the Russian Museum, the Mikhaylovsky Theatre, the Large Concert Hall (Bolshoi Zal) of the St. Petersburg Philharmonic, the Pushkin monument and is not far from the Church of the Savior on Blood.

The Theatre Square is home to the world famous Mariinsky Theatre.

See also
 Historic Centre of Saint Petersburg and Related Groups of Monuments

References

Geography of Saint Petersburg
Saint Petersburg
Financial districts in Russia
Economy of Saint Petersburg